Eutetrapha metallescens is a species of  longhorn beetle in the family Cerambycidae. It was described by Victor Motschulsky in 1860, originally under the genus Saperda.

References

Saperdini
Beetles described in 1860
Taxa named by Victor Motschulsky